A list of films produced by the Ollywood film industry based in Bhubaneswar and Cuttack in the 2000s:

References

2000s
Ollywood
Films, Ollywood